Ángel Ladimir Nesbitt (born December 4, 1990) is a Venezuelan professional baseball pitcher for the Lexington Legends of the Atlantic League of Professional Baseball. He played in Major League Baseball (MLB) for the Detroit Tigers.

Career

Detroit Tigers
Nesbitt was signed by the Detroit Tigers as an international free agent in April 2009. He made his professional debut that year with the VSL Tigers of the Venezuelan Summer League, and played for them until 2011. He spent 2012 with the Connecticut Tigers and 2013 with the West Michigan Whitecaps. In 2014, he pitched for the Lakeland Flying Tigers and Erie SeaWolves, combining for a 1.48 ERA and 20 saves in 48 games. He was added to the Tigers 40-man roster on November 20, 2014.

Despite having never pitched above Double-A in his minor league career, Nesbitt made the Tigers' Opening Day roster out of spring training in 2015. He made his Major league debut on April 8, retiring the only batter he faced, and earned his first win on May 12. On June 13, after conceding runs in five of his previous six appearances, Nesbitt was optioned to the Triple-A Toledo Mud Hens. In 24 games with Detroit, Nesbitt pitched to a 5.40 ERA, striking out 14 in 21.2 innings pitched. Nesbitt struggled in Toledo as well, pitching to a 6.25 ERA with 30 strikeouts and 21 walks in 40.1 innings pitched, and as a result, wasn't recalled to Detroit when the rosters expanded in September.

Fighting for a spot in the bullpen for 2016, Nesbitt injured his ankle during spring training, and opened the season in May with Lakeland on a rehab assignment before being optioned to Toledo. After pitching to a 6.66 ERA in 20 appearances with Toledo, Nesbitt was demoted back to Erie. Across all three minor league levels in 2016, Nesbitt went 2-2 with a 4.91 ERA, striking out 42 and walking 19 in 47.2 innings pitched. On December 23, Nesbitt was designated for assignment, but remained in the organization when he was outrighted on January 6, 2017. He elected free agency on November 6, 2017. On November 17, he received a 50–game suspension for PED use. He will begin serving the suspension once he signs with an organization.

Sugar Land Skeeters
On June 29, 2018, Nesbitt signed with the Sugar Land Skeeters of the Atlantic League of Professional Baseball. He was released on August 10, 2018.

Pericos de Puebla
On May 3, 2019, Nesbitt signed with the Pericos de Puebla of the Mexican League. He was released on May 14, 2019.

Lexington Legends
On February 22, 2022, Nesbitt signed with the Lexington Legends of the Atlantic League of Professional Baseball.

See also

 List of Major League Baseball players from Venezuela

References

External links

 
 

1990 births
Living people
Bravos de Margarita players
Connecticut Tigers players
Detroit Tigers players
Dominican Summer League Tigers players
Venezuelan expatriate baseball players in the Dominican Republic
Erie SeaWolves players
Lakeland Flying Tigers players
Major League Baseball players from Venezuela
Pericos de Puebla players
Toledo Mud Hens players
Venezuelan expatriate baseball players in Mexico
Venezuelan expatriate baseball players in the United States
Venezuelan Summer League Tigers players
West Michigan Whitecaps players
Sportspeople from Maracay